Simpsonodon is an extinct genus of docodontan mammaliaform known from the Middle Jurassic of England, Kyrgyzstan and Russia. The type species S. oxfordensis was described from the Kirtlington Mammal Bed and Watton Cliff in the Forest Marble Formation of England. It was named after George Gaylord Simpson, a pioneering mammalologist and contributor to the Modern Evolutionary Synthesis. A second species S. sibiricus is known from the Itat Formation of Russia, and indeterminate species of the genus are also known from the Balabansai Formation in Kyrgyzstan

References 

Docodonts
Prehistoric cynodont genera
Bathonian life
Callovian life
Middle Jurassic synapsids of Asia
Middle Jurassic synapsids of Europe
Jurassic England
Fossils of England
Fossils of Kyrgyzstan
Fossil taxa described in 1987
Taxa named by Kenneth A. Kermack
Taxa named by Patricia M. Lees
Taxa named by Frances Mussett